Bazemore is a surname originating from the German Bessemer, an occupational surname for a broom maker (besem meaning broom in Middle High German). It may refer to the following notable people:
Debra Bazemore (born 1957), American politician 
Ernestine Bazemore, American politician
Kent Bazemore (born 1989), American basketball player

See also
Bessemer (surname)

References

German-language surnames